Yuldashevo (Yuldaş) is a rural locality (a village) in Urgalinsky Selsoviet, Belokataysky District, Bashkortostan, Russia. The population was 102 as of 2010. There are 2 streets.

Geography 
Yuldashevo is located 30 km southeast of Novobelokatay (the district's administrative centre) by road. Karantrav is the nearest rural locality.

References 

Rural localities in Belokataysky District